Pinto Bandeira is a municipality in the state of Rio Grande do Sul, Brazil. Its population was 3,036 (2020) and its area is 105 km2.

See also
List of municipalities in Rio Grande do Sul

References

Municipalities in Rio Grande do Sul